This is a list of PlayStation 2 games later made available for purchase and download from the PlayStation Store for the PlayStation 3 video game console.

There are 336 such games out of the 4491 released for PlayStation 2.

PlayStation 2 Classics
PlayStation 2 Classics are not remasters, and therefore do not have Trophy support or improved visuals. PlayStation 2 Classics are emulated on the PlayStation 3. For HD remakes see High-definition remasters for PlayStation consoles.

Notes

References

2